Lucy Cullen-Byrne from Wicklow was the ninth president of the Camogie Association. She was born Lucy Florence Cullen in Rathmore, Ashford, County Wicklow, daughter of Laurence Cullen, farmer, and Julia Cullen (née Ryder).

Activist
Lucy Byrne was prominent in many national organisations and her home was frequently raided by British forces during the War of Independence. With her husband, she took the treaty side during the civil war and was expelled by the camogie association for fielding an all-Wicklow "‘Ireland"‘ team in the 1924 Tailteann Games, an issue which may have been related to pro and anti-treaty divisions within the sport.

Presidency
Access to Croke Park and radio broadcasts of All Ireland finals were the major issues facing the game during her presidency. An inter-provincial competition organised during her presidency to mark the golden jubilee of the association in 1954 evolved to become the annual Gael Linn Cup inter-provincial series in 1956.

Marriage
On 3 June 1919 she married Christopher Byrne, quartermaster of the Wicklow Brigade of the IRA and chairman of Rathdrum district council, show shortly afterwards to become member of Wicklow County Council (1920–1958), succeed Robert Barton as Wicklow County Council chairman, serving for seventeen of the years between June 1922 and 1945, and Sinn Féin TD for Kildare–Wicklow from 1921, He served on the GAA Central Council from 1908, as chairman of Wicklow County Board (1931–54) and was active in promoting the playing of camogie.  

They lived at Ballykillavane, Glenealy, Co Wicklow, and had no children. Her sister Julia was married to another TD, Michael Staines, who briefly became Garda Commissioner in 1922.

References

Gaelic games players from County Wicklow
Presidents of the Camogie Association
Year of birth missing
Year of death missing